Óscar Fernando Cortés Corredor (Bogotá, 19 October 1968 or 31 December 1970) is a retired Colombian football player.

He played mostly for Millonarios. He also played for the Colombia national football team and was a participant at the 1994 FIFA World Cup.

Honours

References

1968 births
Living people
Colombian footballers
Categoría Primera A players
Millonarios F.C. players
Colombia international footballers
1994 FIFA World Cup players
1993 Copa América players
Association football defenders
Footballers from Bogotá
Millonarios F.C. managers